Moregatta is a rural locality in the Tablelands Region, Queensland, Australia.

Geography 
The south-western part of the locality is part of the Herberton Range National Park. The remainder of the locality is use for farming, predominantly dairy cattle.

History 
The locality takes its name from its railway station, which was named 23 July 1920 by the Queensland Railways Department, reportedly being an Aboriginal word, meaning level ground.

Moregatta Provisional School opened on 11 April 1927. In 1935 a new building was constructed for Moregatta State School. The school closed in 1948.

References 

Localities in Queensland
Tablelands Region